DNA-directed RNA interference (DRNAI) is a gene-silencing technique that utilizes DNA constructs to activate an animal cell's endogenous RNA interference (RNAI) pathways. DNA constructs are designed to express self-complementary double-stranded RNAs, typically short-hairpin RNAs , that once processed bring about silencing of a target gene or genes. Any RNA including endogenous messenger RNA (mRNAs) or viral RNAs, can be silenced by designing constructs to express double-stranded RNA complementary to the desired mRNA target.

This mechanism has been demonstrated to work as a novel therapeutic to silence disease-causing genes across a range of disease models, including viral diseases such as HIV, hepatitis B or hepatitis C, or diseases associated with altered expression of endogenous genes such as drug-resistant lung cancer, neuropathic pain, advanced cancer,  and retinitis pigmentosa.

ddRNAi mechanism 
Unlike small interfering RNA (siRNA) therapeutics that turn over within a cell and consequently only silence genes transiently, DNA constructs are continually transcribed, replenishing the cellular ‘dose’ of shRNA, thereby enabling long-term silencing of targeted genes. The ddRNAi mechanism, therefore, offers the potential for ongoing clinical benefit with reduced medical intervention.

Organization of ddRNAi constructs 
Figure 2 illustrates the most common type of ddRNAi DNA construct, which is designed to express a shRNA. This consists of a promoter sequence, driving expression of sense and antisense sequences separated by a loop sequence, followed by a transcriptional terminator. The antisense species processed from the shRNA can bind to the target RNA and specify its degradation. shRNA constructs typically encode sense and antisense sequences of 20 – 30 nucleotides. Flexibility in construct design is possible: for example, the positions of sense and antisense sequences can be reversed, and other modifications and additions can alter intracellular shRNA processing. Moreover, a variety of promoter loop and terminator sequences can be used.

A particularly useful variant is a multi-cassette (Figure 2b). Designed to express two or more shRNAs, they can target multiple sequences for degradation simultaneously. This is a particularly useful strategy for targeting viruses. Natural sequence variations can render a single shRNA-target site unrecognizable preventing RNA degradation. Multi-cassette constructs that target multiple sites within the same viral RNA circumvent this issue.

Delivery 

Delivery of ddRNAi DNA constructs is simplified by the existence of a number of clinically-approved and well-characterized gene therapy vectors developed for the purpose. Delivery is a major challenge for RNAi-based therapeutics with new modifications and reagents continually being developed to optimize target cell delivery. Two broad strategies to facilitate delivery of DNA constructs to the desired cells are available: these use either viral vectors or one of a number of classes of transfection reagents.

In vivo delivery of ddRNAi constructs has been demonstrated using a range of vectors and reagents with different routes of administration (ROA).

ddRNAi constructs have also been successfully delivered into host cells ex vivo, and then transplanted back into the host.

For example, in a Phase I clinical trial at the City of Hope National Medical Center, California, US, four HIV-positive patients with non-Hodgkin's lymphoma were successfully treated with autologous hematopoietic progenitor cells pre-transduced ex vivo with ddRNAi constructs using lentiviral vectors. This construct was designed to express three therapeutic RNAs, one of which was a shRNA, thereby combating HIV replication in three different ways: 
shRNA, that silences the tat and rev genes of the HIV genome
CCR5 ribozyme, inhibiting viral cell entry
TAR decoy RNA, inhibiting initiation of viral transcription.

Ongoing expression of the shRNA has been confirmed in T cells, monocytes and B cells more than one year after transplantation.

Therapeutic applications

Neuropathic pain 

Nervana is an investigational ddRNAi construct that knocks down the expression of protein kinase C gamma (PKCγ) known to be associated with neuropathic pain and morphine tolerance.

Two conserved PKCγ sequences found across all key model species and humans have been identified, and both single and double DNA cassettes designed. In vitro, expression of PKCγ was silenced by 80%. When similar ddRNAi constructs were delivered intrathecally using a lentiviral vector, pain relief in a neuropathic-rat model was demonstrated.

Drug-resistant non-small-cell lung cancer 

The development of resistance to chemotherapies such as paclitaxel and cisplatin in non-small-cell lung cancer (NSCLC) is strongly associated with over expression of beta III tubulin. Investigations by the Children's Cancer Institute Australia (University of NSW, Lowy Cancer Research Centre) demonstrated that beta III-tubulin knockdown by ddRNAi delayed tumor growth and increased chemosensitivity in mouse models.

Tributarna is a triple DNA cassette expressing three shRNA molecules that each separately target beta III tubulin and strongly inhibit its expression. Studies in an orthotopic-mouse model, where the construct is delivered by a modified polyethylenimine vector, jetPEI, that targets lung tissue are in progress.

Hepatitis B viral infection 

The hepatitis B virus (HBV) genome encodes its own DNA polymerase for replication. Biomics Biotechnologies has evaluated around 5000 siRNA sequences of this gene for effective knockdown; five sequences were chosen for further investigation and shown to have potent silencing activity when converted into shRNA expression cassettes. A multi-cassette construct, Hepbarna, is under preclinical development for delivery by an adeno-associated virus 8 (AAV-8) liver-targeting vector.

Oculopharyngeal muscular dystrophy 

Classified as an orphan disease, there is currently no therapy for OPMD, caused by a mutation in the poly(A) binding protein nuclear 1 (PABPN1) gene. Silencing the mutant gene using ddRNAi offers a potential therapeutic approach.

HIV/AIDS 

Besides the ex vivo approach by the City of Hope National Medical Center discussed above, the Center for Infection and Immunity Amsterdam (CINIMA), University of Amsterdam, the Netherlands, is extensively researching the composition of multi-cassette DNA constructs to tackle HIV.

Safety concerns 

As with all gene therapies, a number of safety and toxicity issues need to be evaluated during the development of ddRNAi therapeutics:

Oncogene activation by viral insertion: Some gene therapy vectors integrate into the host genome, thereby acting as insertional mutagens. This was a particular issue with early retroviral vectors where insertions adjacent to oncogenes resulted in the development of lymphoid tumors. AAV vectors are considered a low risk for host-genome integration, as adeno-associated virus infection has not been associated with the induction of cancers in humans despite widespread prevalence across the general population. Moreover, extensive clinical use of AAV vectors has provided no evidence of carcinogenicity. While lentiviral vectors do integrate into the genome they do not appear to show a propensity to activate oncogene expression.

Immune response to gene therapy vectors: An immunological response to an adenoviral vector resulted in the death of a patient in an early human trial. Careful monitoring of potential toxicities in preclinical testing and analyses of pre-existing antibodies to gene therapy vectors in patients minimizes such risks.

Innate immune response: siRNAs have been shown to activate immune responses through interaction with Toll-like receptors leading to interferon responses. These receptors reside on the cells surface and so ddRNAi constructs – delivered directly into intracellular space – are not expected to induce this response.

Toxic effects due to over-expression of shRNAs: High level expression of shRNAs has been shown to be toxic. Strategies to minimize levels of shRNA expression or promote precise processing of shRNAs can overcome this problem.

Off-target effects: Unintended silencing of genes that share sequence homology with expressed shRNAs can theoretically occur. Careful selection of shRNA sequences and thorough preclinical testing of constructs can circumvent this issue.

Further reading

References 

RNA
DNA
RNA interference
Gene expression
Molecular genetics
Medical genetics
Genetic engineering
Stem cells
Biotechnology products